The Indian Institute of Foreign Trade (IIFT) is a leading business school of India. Established in 1963, it works as an autonomous body under the Ministry of Commerce and Industry, Government of India. It also functions as a civil services training institute. Its main campus is in New Delhi and new campuses are in Kolkata and Kakinada.

History 
The institute was established as a Centre of Excellence in International Trade and Business in 1963 by Government of India. As of 2021, it is as an autonomous educational institute under the Ministry of Commerce and Industry.

It was granted "Deemed to be University" status in 2002. The National Assessment and Accreditation Council (NAAC) has recognized IIFT as Grade ‘A’ Institution in 2005 as well as in 2015.

Campuses

IIFT Delhi Campus 
The IIFT Delhi campus is located in Qutub Institutional Area, overlooking green ridge and historical Qutub Minar. The campus spread over 6.5 acres of land houses two academic blocks and two residential blocks for students and visiting faculty.

IIFT Kolkata Campus

IIFT's Kolkata Campus is located at the East Kolkata off EM Bypass in a sprawling area of around 7 acres. The campus is developed as a green and fully integrated campus with independent blocks for academic, administration and student living areas with all modern amenities. The campus also houses three water bodies to maintain ecological diversity with enough greenery.

IIFT Kakinada Campus
In 2018, then Union Minister for Commerce and Industry Suresh Prabhu, in the presence of Chief Minister N. Chandrababu Naidu laid the foundation stone for 3rd campus of Indian Institute of Foreign Trade (IIFT) in Kakinada of East Godavari district at Andhra Pradesh. The State Government has allotted 25 acres land to build the Campus. Starting of IIFT full time 5 year integrated MBA(IB) Programme in a temporary premises at Kakinada has been approved. Commencement of such a programme in 2022-24 will be subject to approval of UGC.

Facilities

Hostel facilities
The MBA (International Business) is a fully residential programme. The hostels have a common room with a television and table-tennis table where students can relax and rejuvenate. They also have an air-conditioned mess.

Library
The Institute's has a well-equipped library. It has a collection of latest books by eminent authors on Trade, Economy, Management and WTO related issues. It also has a collection of journals, research reports, company reports, CD-ROMs, video cassettes, International Trade Statistics and Databases. Apart from books on traditional Management and Economics related areas, the Library has huge collection of books on upcoming areas like WTO, Intellectual Property Rights, Services Management, Mergers & Acquisitions, Trade Finance, e-Business, Global Business Strategies, International Business Law, and Information Technology, etc. The Library also subscribes to over 235 Journals and Periodicals and has enriched itself with publications of national and international organizations such as UN, ITC, UNCTAD, WTO, IMF, World Bank, Ministries and Departments of Government of India.

Academics

Academic programmes 
Two-year MBA (International Business) at New Delhi and Kolkata.
Ph.D. (Management) Programme at Delhi and Kolkata. 
Ph.D. (Economics) Programme at Delhi and Kolkata. 
Two-year MA (Economics – Specialization in Trade and Finance) at New Delhi and Kolkata. 
Two years & six months MBA (International Business) Weekend at New Delhi and Kolkata. 
Executive Post Graduate Diploma in International Business at New Delhi and Kolkata. 
Executive Post Graduate Diploma in International Business (Hybrid) at Delhi. 
Executive Post Graduate Diploma in International Business (On-campus) at Delhi. 
Two Years MBA in International Businessi n collaboration with the Institute of Finance Management, Dar es Salaam,Tanzania 
Post Graduate Certificate Programme in International Business and Finance (Hybrid). 
Certificate Programme in Export Import Management.

IIFT has, over the years, undertaken research studies with organisations like World Trade Organization, World Bank, the United Nations Conference on Trade and Development (UNCTAD) and the Ministry of Commerce & Industry. IIFT has also trained more than 40,000 business professionals across 30 countries via its management development programmes.

Selection Process

Selection in IIFT is a four-pronged process:
 The entrance test is a paper-based test which takes place in November, whereas, for admission in Global MBA a computer-based test is conducted by National Testing Agency from academic year 2020-2022 onwards. 
 A short-list based on the test scores is used to invite students for the Group Discussion round. Topics of national and international importance across social, political, economic and corporate domains are common as individuals are tested on their group discussion skills.
 A Writing Ability Test is conducted to test the candidate's writing skills, along with knowledge of the subject and structure of representation.
 The Personal Interview has a distinct focus on goals, achievements, knowledge and awareness.
All of the three ability tests are normally held on a single day. A cumulative weighted score depending on the rules of that particular year of examination is taken to identify the final short-list of candidates separately for IIFT Delhi & IIFT Kolkata.

For admission in M.A. in Economics (Specialization in Trade and Finance), an entrance test based on Economics and Finance is held. The final merit list along with the student's preference decides short-list for IIFT Delhi & IIFT Kolkata.

International Collaborations & Student Exchange Programmes

IIFT Exchange Programme is an outcome of the institute's academic collaboration with institutions across the world. These collaborations are mainly for student, faculty exchange programmes, joint collaborations on research and various other capacity building exercises.
IIFT has developed relations with many international organizations by signing MoUs and participating in their activities or taking collaborative initiatives. The institute is a member of the following International organizations:
 Academy of International Business (AIB)
 Association of Management Development Institutes in South Asia (AMDISA)
 International Association of Trade Training Organization (IATTO)
 The Association of Advance Collegiate Schools of Business (AACSB)
 The European Foundation for Management Development (EFMD)

Rankings

IIFT was ranked 11th best B-school in India in 2020. It was ranked 1st in India in D2C Competitive B-School Awards in 2021.

Port Visit and Social Awareness Program

IIFT also offers its students opportunity to visit various national and international ports. Students can choose their port of choice and are accompanied by faculty members during the visit. This is in line with the goal of providing practical exposure to what is being taught in class.

The institute also has a month-long social awareness program, in which several NGOs such as Muskaan Foundation are invited to the campus to pitch their projects to the students. The students are then allowed to choose any NGO of choice and have to work closely with the NGO for the next month. The SAP is a part of the course curriculum, and IIFT is one of the few institutions who have undertaken similar social programs.

Papers and publications
The research carried out by the institute is widely disseminated in the form of study reports, monographs and occasional papers. The major beneficiaries of these research findings are academicians, policy makers, trade and industry, multilateral organizations, researchers and NGOs. In addition, the Institute publishes a quarterly journal Foreign Trade Review published by SAGE Publications. The journal focuses on key relevant areas such as international trade, finance, econometrics, IT, WTO, Trade blocs and marketing. Focus WTO, another quarterly journal published by the Institute focuses exclusively on WTO related issues. Each issue of the journal is thematic. An electronic magazine E-Zine is also published by the Centre for International Trade in Technology of IIFT.

Organisation and administration

Centres at IIFT

Centre for International Trade in Technology
It is an institution in which roles of active players in international technology trade especially those of Ministry of Commerce & Industry and Ministry of Science and Technology are proposed to be synthesised.

Centre for WTO Studies
The major objective of the centre has been to provide research and analytical support on a continuous basis to the Department of Commerce on identified issues pertaining to the World Trade Organization. In addition, it is also tasked to carry out research activities, bring out Publications on WTO related subjects, carry out Outreach & Capacity Building programmes by organising seminars, workshops, subject specific meetings etc., and to be a repository of important WTO documents in its Trade Resource Centres

Centre for Trade and Investment Law
The Centre for Trade and Investment Law (CTIL) was established in the year 2016 and the centre's primary objective is to provide sound and rigorous analysis of legal issues pertaining to international trade and investment law to the Government of India and other governmental agencies. Further, the Centre aims to create a dedicated pool of legal experts who could provide technical inputs for enhancing India's participation in international trade and investment negotiations and dispute settlement. In addition, the Centre aims to be a thought leader in the various domains of international economic law such as WTO law, international investment law and legal issues relating to economic integration.

Centre for MSME Studies
The growing importance of Micro, Small and Medium Enterprises in the economy as a whole and External Trade, in particular, has prompted IIFT to establish a separate Centre for MSME studies which can act as a catalyst to the internationalization of MSME activities. The center has become operational from May 2005. The Centre for MSME Studies at IIFT provides continuous support to the MSME sector by carrying out activities which can be broadly classified into conducting Training Programmes, provision of Business Intelligence services through a Databank and acting as a catalyst for Interfacing with other concerned and associated institutions.

Centre for North Eastern Studies (CeNEST)
North Eastern Council (NEC) has entered into an agreement with Indian Institute of Foreign Trade (IIFT) for the setting up of Centre for North Eastern Studies (CeNEST) at  IIFT Kolkata Campus.
The centre would facilitate the North Eastern states in policy making, strategic planning and effective implementation of various trade promotion schemes and undertake research and analysis on issues relating to international trade and business, capacity building and serve as a knowledge partner.It will help the states in exploiting the potentials of exports of the products from the region and promote innovations in business.

Student life
The institute has a student body called International Management Forum (IMF). IMF is the official representative student body at IIFT which acts as a coordinator for, and provides administrative support to, various student activities and events at IIFT besides taking policy decisions regarding student affairs in consultation with the Director/Chairperson/Programme Director.
Among the key roles of IMF is co-ordination and supervision of the activities of various domain-specific clubs and cells. 6 clubs and 7 cells work to ensure collaborative and comprehensive learning round the year. The clubs impart domain and industry-specific knowledge via Knowledge Transfer Sessions throughout the year. Also the practical learning experience is enhanced through the regularly scheduled competitions-case studies, Group discussions, quizzes, etc. Live projects from various corporates in all domains are also brought by clubs, which ensures significant industry exposure. The activities of the clubs and cells are supervised by the General Secretary, a member of the IMF.

Notable alumni
 Rashesh Shah, founder of Edelweiss Capital
 Mr. Aseem Puri, CEO Unilever Korea & CMO Unilever International
Mr. Manu Sawhney, former CEO, ICC
 Mr. Mohit Malhotra, CEO Dabur
Sheikh Noorul Hassan, Member of the Legislative Assembly (India)

See also
 Indian Institutes of Management

References

External links
 

Universities and colleges in Delhi
Foreign trade of India
Business schools in Delhi
1963 establishments in West Bengal
Educational institutions established in 1963